FleishmanHillard Inc. (formerly, Fleishman–Hillard) is a public relations and marketing agency founded and based in St. Louis, Missouri. It was acquired by Omnicom Group in 1997, becoming part of the Diversified Agency Services (DAS) division. The company was founded in 1946 by Alfred Fleishman and Robert E. Hillard.

In 1994, the company expanded its operations to the Asia Pacific region with an office in Beijing. In May 2013, the company rebranded its name to FleishmanHillard and launched the slogan "the Power of True". As of April 2021, the company had 78 offices in 30 countries across the Americas, Asia Pacific, Europe, Middle East, and Africa.

References

External links 
 FleishmanHillard website

Public relations companies of the United States
Marketing companies established in 1946
Companies based in St. Louis
1946 establishments in Missouri